The Bermel Peninsula is a rugged, mountainous peninsula, approximately 15 mi (24 km) long and 7 mi (11 km) wide, located at  between Solberg Inlet and Mobiloil Inlet on the Bowman Coast, Graham Land, Antarctica.  The feature rises to 1,670 m (5479 ft) in Bowditch Crests and includes Yule Peak, Mount Wilson, Campbell Crest, Vesconte Point, Wilson Pass, Rock Pile Peaks, Miyoda Cliff, and Rock Pile Point.

The peninsula lies along the route explored and photographed from the air by Sir Hubert Wilkins, 1928, and Lincoln Ellsworth, 1935, and was first mapped from the Ellsworth photographs by W.L.G. Joerg in 1937. The United States Antarctic Service explored this area from the ground, 1939–41, roughly positioning the peninsula.  The USAS also photographed the feature from the air in 1940, referring to it as "The Rock Pile" or "Rock Pile Point" from the appearance as a jumbled mass of peaks.  The USBGN approved the name Rock Pile Point for the peninsula in 1947, but the decision was subsequently vacated.  Although Rock Pile Peaks was approved for eastern summits and Rock Pile Point for the east extremity, the peninsula remained unnamed for about four decades.  However, reference to a geographic feature of this magnitude is needed, and in 1993 the UK-APC recommended the peninsula be named after Peter F. Bermel, Member, U.S. Advisory Committee on Antarctic Names, 1979-94 (Chairman, 1993–94).

External links 
 (PD source)

Peninsulas of Graham Land
Bowman Coast